Ochamchira District is a district of the partially recognised Abkhazia. Its capital is Ochamchire, the town by the same name. The district is smaller than the Ochamchire district in the de jure subdivision of Georgia, as some of its former territory is now part of Tkvarcheli District, formed by de facto Abkhaz authorities in 1995. The population of the Ochamchira district is 24,629 according to the 2003 census. Until the August 2008 Battle of the Kodori Valley, some mountainous parts of the district were still under Georgian control, as part of Upper Abkhazia.

Administration
In 1997, Khrips Jopua became Head of Administration. Jopua was reappointed on 10 May 2001 following the March 2001 local elections.

After Sergei Bagapsh became president in 2005, he appointed Vladimir Atumava to succeed Appolon Dumaa on 21 February 2005. 22 February 2007 Atumava was released from office and temporarily replaced by his deputy Ramaza Jopua. On 3 April Daur Tarba became the new head of the administration. On 18 December 2008, Tarba asked to be released from office, and he was replaced by Murman Jopua, who had until then been vice head. The new vice head is Zurab Kajaia. Tarba went on to become chairman of United Abkhazia.

On 3 June 2014, following the 2014 Abkhazian political crisis, acting President Valeri Bganba dismissed Murman Jopua, as had been demanded by protesters, and appointed his Deputy Mikhail Agrba as acting District Head. After the election of Raul Khajimba as president, he on 28 October appointed Beslan Akhuba as acting Head in Agrba's stead. On 21 July 2015 Akhuba was in turn replaced by Khrips Jopua as acting Head, who had been Head of the State Repatriation Committee until recently and who had already governed Ochamchira District between 1997 and 2004. On 25 September, Jopua was appointed permanently to the post.

List of Administration Heads

Demographics
According to 2011 census, the population of the district was 24 868 people, consisting of:
 Abkhazians (77.7%)
 Georgians (9.5%)
 Armenians (6.6%)
 Russians (3.9%)
 Ukrainians (0,3%)
 Greeks (0.2%)

Settlements
The district's main settlements are:
 Ochamchire
 Ilori
 Labra
 Mokvi

See also
 Administrative divisions of Abkhazia

References

 
Districts of Abkhazia